Major Sir John Alder Burdon  (23 August 1866 – 9 January 1933) was Governor-General of British Honduras (now Belize) from 1925 to 1932. He also wrote Brief Sketch of British Honduras, Past, Present and Future (1927).

Born 23 August 1866 in Beijing, China, he was the son of Bishop John Shaw Burdon and Phoebe Esther Alder. He was educated in England, enlisting in the British Military in 1888 and served in the Cameron Highlanders. In early 1900 he was appointed Assistant Resident in Northern Nigeria. By 1910 he was the Colonial Secretary of Barbados (Acting Governor 1910-11), and married Katherine Janet Sutherland 17 December 1910. He then served as Administrator of St. Kitts and Nevis (1916-1925) before his appointment as Governor-General of British Honduras from 1925 to 1932. He died on 9 January 1933, aged 66.

References

1866 births
1933 deaths
Companions of the Order of St Michael and St George
Knights Commander of the Order of the British Empire
Governors-General of Belize
Governors of British Honduras
People from colonial Nigeria
Colonial Secretaries of Barbados
Governors of Saint Christopher-Nevis-Anguilla
Manchester Regiment soldiers
Loyal Regiment officers
Queen's Own Cameron Highlanders officers